Sommer and Behles was a 19th-century Italian photography studio created by the partnership of photographers Giorgio Sommer (1834-1914) and Edmund Behles (1841-1921). Studios were located in Rome at No. 28 Mario di Fiori, and in Naples at No. 4 Monte di Dio. Each photographer had independent careers and studios prior to and following the partnership which began in 1867 and was dissolved in 1874.

References

External links
Paris Photographer Pierre Torset

Culture in Rome
Photographic studios
19th-century Italian photographers
Photography companies of Italy